John Scarlett, (born 1948) was Director General of the British Secret Intelligence Service.

John Scarlett or Scarlet may also refer to:

John Scarlet, Indonesian footballer
John Scarlet (MP) for Southampton (UK Parliament constituency)
John Scarlett (footballer), (born 1947) former Australian rules footballer
John Scarlett (Toronto), (1777–1865) Canadian merchant-miller, and pioneer

See also